Core-binding factor subunit beta is a protein that in humans is encoded by the CBFB gene.

The protein encoded by this gene is the beta subunit of a heterodimeric core-binding transcription factor belonging to the PEBP2/CBF transcription factor family which master-regulates a host of genes specific to hematopoiesis (e.g., RUNX1) and osteogenesis (e.g., RUNX2). The beta subunit is a non-DNA binding regulatory subunit; it allosterically enhances DNA binding by the alpha subunit as the complex binds to the core site of various enhancers and promoters, including murine leukemia virus, polyomavirus enhancer, T-cell receptor enhancers and GM-CSF promoters. Alternative splicing generates two mRNA variants, each encoding a distinct carboxyl terminus. In some cases, a pericentric inversion of chromosome 16 [inv(16)(p13q22)] produces a chimeric transcript consisting of the N terminus of core-binding factor beta in a fusion with the C-terminal portion of the smooth muscle myosin heavy chain 11. This chromosomal rearrangement is associated with acute myeloid leukemia of the M4Eo subtype. Two transcript variants encoding different isoforms have been found for this gene.

Mutations in CBFB are implicated in cases of breast cancer.

Core binding factor acute myeloid leukaemia is a cancer related to genetic changes in the CBF gene. It is most commonly caused by an inversion of particular region of chromosome 16; however it can also be caused by translocation between copies of chromosome 16. The rearrangements cause formation of CBF but with impaired function. This prevents proper differentiation of blood cells, leading to the formation of Myeloblast.

References

External links

Further reading

Oncogenes